"The Hurtin's All Over" is a single by American country music artist Connie Smith.  Released in September 1966, the song reached #3 on the Billboard Hot Country Singles chart.  The single was later released on Smith's 1967 album entitled Downtown Country. Wanda Jackson covered the song on her 1968 album Cream of the Crop.

Chart performance

References

1966 singles
Connie Smith songs
Songs written by Harlan Howard
Song recordings produced by Bob Ferguson (musician)
1966 songs
RCA Victor singles